Bigard is a French surname. Notable people with the surname include:

Barney Bigard, American jazz clarinetist
Jean-Marie Bigard, French comedian and actor
Jean-Paul Bigard, founder of Groupe Bigard

See also
Groupe Bigard, French meat processing company

French-language surnames